Xuanwu District is one of 11 districts of Nanjing, the capital of Jiangsu province, China. Xuanwu District is an urban centre located in the north-eastern part of Nanjing. It is the site of the Nanjing Municipal Government.

Administrative subdivisions
Xuanwu has administrative jurisdiction over the following 7 subdistricts:

 Defunct - Houzaimen Subdistrict merged into Meiyuan Xincun in 2012

Economy
The main industries in the district are the leisure and tourism, information technology, retail and services. Its economy is primarily based upon the delivery of services. Industry zones include the Changjiang Road Cultural Area, Xinjiekou Central Economic Area, and Xuzhuang Software Industry Base. The district has attracted multi-national corporations, such as 3M, American Express, Siemens, Hyundai, Samsung, NYK Line, and Cathay Life Insurance.

Education
There are more than 40 colleges, universities and research institutes in the district, including Southeast University, Nanjing University of Science and Technology, Nanjing Agricultural University, Nanjing Forestry University and Jiangsu Academy of Agricultural Sciences. There are about 35 academics from the Chinese Academy of Engineering and Chinese Academy of Sciences there, which represents about 50% of the academics from those academies in Jiangsu Province.

Transportation
Transportation within the district includes Line 1 and Line 2 of the Nanjing Metro have stations within the district. Other sources of transportation 20 or more minutes from the district are the Nanjing Railway Station, Shanghai-Nanjing Railway and Nanjing Lukou Airport.

Attractions
The scenic Xuanwu District is also known for its tourists attractions like the Sun Yat-sen Mausoleum, Xuanwu Lake and the Hongwu Emperor's Mausoleum, which is listed one of the Imperial Tombs of the Ming and Qing Dynasties that are listed as a UNESCO World Heritage Site. The district has more than 58 percent green cover.

Adjacent to Xuanwu Lake is the Nanjing International Exhibition Center.

References

County-level divisions of Jiangsu
Districts of Nanjing